The Dixie Merchant is a 1926 American silent drama film directed by Frank Borzage and starring Jack Mulhall, Madge Bellamy, and J. Farrell MacDonald.

Cast

References

Bibliography
 Solomon, Aubrey. The Fox Film Corporation, 1915-1935: A History and Filmography. McFarland, 2011.

External links

1926 films
1926 drama films
Silent American drama films
American silent feature films
1920s English-language films
Fox Film films
Films directed by Frank Borzage
American black-and-white films
1920s American films